Semih Güler (born 30 November 1994) is a German professional footballer who plays as a centre-back for  Süper Lig side Adana Demirspor.

Career
Güler began his senior career with the German club Westfalia Herne in 2013. In the summer of 2014, he transferred to Eskişehirspor. He made his professional debut with Eskişehirspor in a 4–2 Turkish Cup loss to Galatasaray 3 December 2014. He shortly after went on loan to Eyüpspor for two seasons before returning to Eskişehirspor as a starter. On 13 January 2019, he transferred to Adana Demirspor.

Personal life
Born in Germany, Güler is of Turkish descent.

Honours
Adana Demirspor
TFF 1. Lig: 2020–21

References

External links
 
 
 

1994 births
Living people
People from Castrop-Rauxel
German people of Turkish descent
Sportspeople from Münster (region)
German footballers
Footballers from North Rhine-Westphalia
Association football defenders
Süper Lig players
TFF First League players
TFF Second League players
SC Westfalia Herne players
Eskişehirspor footballers
Eyüpspor footballers
Adana Demirspor footballers